Saban or Šaban may refer to:

People
 Saban (name), for people with the name
 Sabans, a small indigenous ethnic group of Sarawak, Malaysia 
Şaban, a Turkish film character

Other uses
Saban Capital Group, a private investment firm investing in music and entertainment
Saban Center for Middle East Policy, part of the Brookings Institution
Saban Entertainment, a defunct television production company
Saban grizzled langur, a species of monkey
Saban Theatre, Beverly Hills, California
Şaban, the Turkish name for the Islamic calendar month Sha'aban
Saban Bowl, an annual football game that is part of the Alabama–LSU football rivalry

See also
Sabah (disambiguation)
Sabean (disambiguation)
Sabian (disambiguation)
Sha'ban (disambiguation)
Shaban (name)